The  is a festival held annually in Fukuoka, Japan. With more than 840 years of history, Dontaku is a traditional festival. Among Fukuoka citizens it has become an important part of Fukuoka citizens' lives and is one of the three major festivals in Fukuoka. Following the opening night event of 2 May, a 1.2 km stretch of Meji-dori, one of Fukuoka's busiest thoroughfares, is closed to vehicles and transformed into "Dontaku Street".

Overview

The Hakata Dontaku is a festival that has been held every year since 1962 during Golden Week, from 3 to 4 May in Fukuoka, Japan.

There are usually over 650 groups, 33,000 people of performer and audience of over 2 million people during these two days. Along with "Takadazyou Hyakumannin Kanoukai" in Nigata Joetsu city, "Hirosaki Sakura festival" in Aomori Hirosaki city and “Hiroshima Flower Festival” in Hiroshima, "Hakata Dontaku" is also one of the most famous and biggest festivals in Japan. Moreover, it is also one of the biggest three festivals in Fukuoka, Two other popular festivals in Fukuoka are “Hakata Gion Yamakasa” and "Houzyouya". Now it is hosted by Fukuoka Chamber of commerce and Fukuoka Tourism Association and is called Fukuoka citizens' Festival – Hakata Dontaku Matsuri.

There will be people from in and outside of Fukuoka as well as from overseas to see this huge festival. This festival has two main parts which are parade and performance. Men and women regardless of age walk through the streets in various costumes, and they are playing some instruments, and others clap with rice scoping spoons (Shamoji). People who join the meeting that is usually held in February can be participated in the parade so in the past Mickey Mouse and Snoopy came and joined the parade. Also, there would be more than 30 stages/performance places in the city.

Etymology
 
The word "Dontaku" originates in Dutch "zondag." "zon" means Sun and "dag" means day. "zondag" itself means Sunday or holiday. Dontaku was named by Meiji government for a holiday at 1879 which is about 150 years ago.

The origins of Hakata Dontaku is called Matsubayashi. Matsubayashi was to celebrate an old New Year. (Lunar New Year.) It was an event of welcoming gods who bring happiness to a new year. The beginning of Matsubayashi was in Kyoto and usually people visited a lord's castle to perform a traditional dance. Since then this celebration had spread to all over the country then it came to Hakata as well. Hakata Matsubayashi started at 1179 so that Hakata Matsubayashi itself has over 840 years of history. Hakata Matsubayashi was to honor Taira no Shigemori after his death. He is known for one of the greatest samurai because he brought further benefit to Hakata by activating the trade with China. People in Hakata started Hakata Matsubayashi as the way to show him respect. This is just one story that has been told how it was started, but there are other historical stories that explain the beginning of Hakata Matsubayashi as well.

The main idea of Hakata Matsubayashi during Edo period (1603年～1868年) was that many samurai visit Fukuoka Castle where Fukuoka han was based. Fukuoka han was the top of all samurai in Fukuoka, so samurais visited them to show respect at the time of Lunar New Year. A line to the Hakata Castle called "Torimon" which consisted of three Gods of fortune. After they visited Hakata han, they went around the city and visited shrines, temples, and houses of person with authority. It was like a huge celebration and citizens joined and enjoyed it by following the line or performing some dance. However, the governor banned it at Meiji 5 (1872) because the government didn't want people to waste their money on this event instead they hoped people to use more money to celebrate the emperor's birthday.

Seven years later, at Meiji 12 (1879), Hakata Matsubayashi was started again and changed the name to "Hakata Dontaku" It has been told that not only the name but event date and style of the event were changed as well. It wasn't a celebration of Lunar New Year anymore and what people did during the festival period slightly adjusted. After all these changes, it was again cancelled at 1941 because of the war. After the war, 1946, the festival was held on 24 May. Since 1949, Hakata Dontaku is held annually from 3–4 May.

Event schedule

2 May 
Hakata Dontaku is a 2 days event but there will be an opening night event night before the festival starting from 4:30 PM until 8:30 PM on 2 May. A group called "Dontaku Tai" will be performing and also people decide the Miss Fukuoka at that night as well. This show will be on RKB Mainichi Broadcastingso that people can enjoy watching this performances on TV. In order to come and see the show people need to have an entrance ticket which will be handed out 2 weeks before the event and free.

3 May 

The first day of Hakata Dontaku. Festival will be starting with origins of Dontaku, Matsubayashi parade. 3 Gods of fortune ride horses and walk around the city of Fukuoka as original Matsubayashi did in the history.

Thousands of performers will be dancing and walking down the street called "Meiji street." People wear various costumes and clap with rice scoping spoons, play instruments, wear masks and so on. Streets will be full of people both performer and audiences. Beside, Hana Jidosha which is cars that are decorated with lights and flowers are also essential part of this event.

4 May 
The second day of Hakata Dontaku. Schedule will be nearly the same as the first day. There will be Hakata Matsubayashi, Parade and Hana Jidosha. Since this is the last day, there will be a finale that everyone gather and dance to enjoy the last moment of the festival.

References

External links
Official website 

Festivals in Japan
Tourist attractions in Fukuoka
Festivals in Fukuoka Prefecture
Events in Fukuoka
Culture in Fukuoka